Poultney may refer to:
 Poultney (town), Vermont, a town in Rutland County
 Poultney (village), Vermont, a village in Rutland County
 Poultney Bigelow (1855–1954), American journalist and author
 Frankie Poultney (born 1973), professional British adagio ice skater
 Walter de Curzon Poultney (1845–1929), Baltimore socialite and art collector